Happyland were an Australian punk rock duo formed in Brisbane, Queensland in 1997 as a side project by Janet English on bass guitar and lead vocals (from Spiderbait) and her then-boyfriend, Quan Yeomans on lead guitar and vocals (from Regurgitator). They were originally named, The Shits, but decided on Happyland. Their only album, Welcome to Happyland, was released on 25 August 1998, via the Polydor Australia label, which reached No. 18 on the ARIA Albums Chart. It provided the single, "Don't You Know Who I Am?" (July 1998), which peaked at No. 24 on the ARIA Singles Chart.

History 

In 1996 Janet English of Spiderbait started dating Quan Yeomans of Regurgitator. During downtime from their respective main projects, in 1997 in Brisbane, the pair formed the Shits (later renamed as Happyland) as an art pop side project. As the Shits, English and Yeomans, provided the artwork for Regurgitor's album, Unit (November 1997); at the ARIA Music Awards of 1998 the duo won the Best Cover Art category.

Happyland's only album, Welcome to Happyland, was released on 25 August 1998 via Polydor Australia, which peaked at No. 18 on the ARIA Albums Chart. It was recorded Yeomans' home studio and produced by the duo, with all tracks co-written by English and Yeomans. AllMusic's Jody Macgregor opined that "The songs they recorded together combined the most hyper-kinetic and poppy sounds common to the two bands, with English's vocals at their most high-pitched and girlish, and Yeomans' melodies at their most twitchy and infectious." Australian musicologist, Ian McFarlane, felt it "boasted noisy modern fuzz-pop." At the ARIA Music Awards of 1999 English and Yeomans were nominated for Best Cover Art for Welcome to Happyland.

"Don't You Know Who I Am?", the lead single from the album, peaked at No. 24 on the ARIA Singles Chart. It was listed at No. 28 in Triple J's 1998 Hottest 100 music poll; while the follow up single, "Hello!" (November 1998), was listed at No. 71. "Hello!", which did not peak in the ARIA Singles Chart top 50, was proposed for Regurgitator's Unit but it did not fit with the rest of its content. McFarlane described "Hello" as "low-tech but snappy pop."

Happyland toured Australia as part of the 1999 Big Day Out music festival, in late January and early February, performing at the Gold Coast, Sydney, Melbourne and Adelaide. In their live shows, the band members dressed in fluffy animal costumes. They provided a cover version the Italian song, "Tintarella di luna" (written by Bruno de Filippi and Franco Migliacci), on the soundtrack for the feature film, Looking for Alibrandi, in 2000. The duo had disbanded in 1999 and each member had returned to their respective main project.

Quan mentioned in a 2001 interview in the Daily Telegraph that Happyland were working on another release. This is backed up by a comment made by Quan, when asked "Will there be any more Happyland releases?", on a web chat for Rolling Stone Australia, in October 2000, he answered, "We may have a song or three for the willing and able out there." However, both have stated that this is unlikely, as they have since split up as a domestic couple, but remain good friends. English replied, in August 2004, to the notion of a reunion, "A Happyland comeback? (laughs) [It] was just the one off thing, just a bit of fun when we had time off from our respective bands. The way that the momentum is going on this stuff [Spiderbait commitments] overseas and Europe I can't imagine I'll have a lot of time to deal with anything like that."

Discography

Albums

Singles

Awards and nominations

ARIA Music Awards
The ARIA Music Awards is an annual awards ceremony that recognises excellence, innovation, and achievement across all genres of Australian music. They commenced in 1987. 

! 
|-
| 1998
| Quan Yeomans and Janet English for Happyland – Welcome to Happyland
| ARIA Award for Best Cover Art
| 
| 
|-

References 

ARIA Award winners
Australian pop punk groups
Musical groups from Brisbane
Musical groups established in 1997
Musical groups disestablished in 1999